The Climate Prediction Center (CPC) is a United States federal agency that is one of the National Centers for Environmental Prediction, which are a part of the National Oceanic and Atmospheric Administration's National Weather Service. CPC is headquartered in College Park, Maryland.  Its roots trace back to the climatological work of Thomas Jefferson, with the United States Army Signal Corp taking over responsibility of the climate program in the late 19th century.  Once it became part of the United States Weather Bureau, it was known as the Weather Bureau Climate and Crop Services.  From 1957 through 1966, the United States Weather Bureau's Office of Climatology, located in Washington, D.C., and then Suitland, Maryland, published the Mariners Weather Log publication.  Late in the 20th century, it was known as the Climate Analysis Center for a time, before evolving into CPC in 1995. CPC issues climate forecasts valid for weeks and months in advance.

History
The roots of modern climate prediction can be traced to the work of one of the nation's first applied climatologists, Thomas Jefferson, third President of the United States. A century later, the federal government assigned to the Army Signal Corps the mission to define the climate of the regions of the country being opened for farming.

In 1890, the United States Department of Agriculture (USDA) created the Weather Bureau climate and crops services which began publishing the Weather and Crops Weekly Bulletin, which the CPC in conjunction with the USDA still publishes today.  The records of the Climate Division span from 1883 to 1961.  For a time during the 1960s, the Weather Bureau's Office of Climatology was located in Suitland, Maryland.

In 1970, various federal weather and climate functions were consolidated into the National Weather Service (NWS) and placed in a new agency called the National Oceanic and Atmospheric Administration (NOAA). In the 1980s the National Weather Service established the Climate Prediction Center, known at the time as the Climate Analysis Center (CAC). The CPC is best known for its United States climate forecasts based on El Niño and La Niña conditions in the tropical Pacific.

Products

The CPC's products are operational predictions of climate variability, real-time monitoring of global climate, and attribution of the origins of major climate anomalies. The products cover time scales from a week to seasons, and cover the land, the ocean, and the atmosphere, extending into the stratosphere.

These climate services are available for users in government, the public and private industry, both in this country and abroad. Applications include the mitigation of weather-related natural disasters and uses for social and economic good in agriculture, energy, transportation, water resources, and health. Continual product improvements are supported through diagnostic research, increasing use of models, and interactions with user groups. Some specific products include:

 3-Month Temperature and Precipitation
 Outlooks
 Discussions
 1-Month Temperature and Precipitation
 Outlooks
 Discussions
 6 to 10-Day and 8 to 14-Day Products
 Temperature and Precipitation Anomaly
 Excessive Heat Outlook
 Maximum Heat Index Prediction
 3-Month probability of exceedance
 Temperature
 Precipitation
 Heating and Cooling Degree Days
 Hurricane Season Outlook
 Atlantic basin
 Pacific basin
 U.S. Drought
 Outlook
 Discussion
 International Support
 Weekly Afghan Hazards
 Weekly Africa Hazards
 Weekly Central America Hazards
 Weekly Haiti Hazards

See also
National Climatic Data Center
Climatology
Coupled Forecast System

References

External links
https://web.archive.org/web/20080616133058/http://www.cpc.noaa.gov/index.php

National Weather Service
Climate change organizations based in the United States
National Centers for Environmental Prediction
Articles containing video clips